Marvel Zombies 5 is a five-issue comic book limited series published by Marvel Comics beginning in June and ending in October 2010. It is part of the Marvel Zombies series. The series is written by Fred Van Lente, penciled by Jose Angel Cano Lopez, with covers by Greg Land.

Plot synopsis
Morbius charges fellow A.R.M.O.R. agents, Machine Man and Howard the Duck, with retrieving different samples of zombies from each reality so that he can find a cure for his infected friend, Jacob Russell. Through their travel they are joined by Jacali Kane, the daughter of supervillain Harry Kane, also known as Hurricane whom before his death, transferred his powers to her.

The team travels through 5 realities. Each reality has its own version of the virus, mimicking a popular horror movie (Romero, Raimi, Boyle, etc.), featuring guest appearances from various Marvel figures from the Wild West, Killraven, Ultron, Thor, Jocasta and Arno Stark (future Iron Man, deceased).

Hurricane, his daughter, and Machine Man killed some zombies, but a group of revived zombies killed Hurricane.

Howard the Duck assembled Dum Dum Dugan and other uninfected people to perform Ducky's Dozen.

They got Killraven and Old Skull to join in with them. When Old Skull was bitten on the arm, his friends had no choice but to amputate his infected arm to prevent him to overpower his own friends as a new zombie, which is successful.

Collected editions
The series has been collected into a single volume:

Marvel Zombies 5 (120 pages, hardcover, November 2010)

References

External links

Reviews

Review: Marvel Zombies 5 #1, Comic Book Resources

Marvel Zombies
Comics by Fred Van Lente
2010 comics debuts

fr:Marvel Zombies